Sara Berenguer Laosa (Barcelona, 1 January 1919 – Montady, 8 June 2010) was a Spanish Catalan militant anarcho-syndicalist, anarcha-feminist, and writer active in the Mujeres Libres movement.

Selected works
 Entre el sol y la tormenta, Barcelona, Seuba, 1988,  462218486.
 Femmes d’Espagne en lutte, le courage anonyme au quotidien de la guerre civile à l’exil, Atelier de création libertaire, 2011,  780276113, notice éditeur .
 Poetry
 Cardos y flores silvestres, 1982.
 Jardiín de Esencias, 1982,
 El lenguaje de las flores, Barcelona, Amarantos, 1992,  81489318.
 Sentiments, (in catalán) Vic Emboscall, 2004,  433333110.
 Anthology
 Con Laura Ruiz, Free women («Mujeres Libres») : voices and memories for a libertarian future, Rótterdam, Boston, Sense, 2011,  668182876.

References

Bibliography
 Hélène Hernández, Sara Berenguer : hasta luego compañera !, Le Monde libertaire, Plantilla:N°, 24 June 2010
 Jacinte Rausa, Sara Berenguer, Éditions lleva Monde libertaire te Éditions Alternative libertaire, 2000,

External links
 Biography at Dictionnaire international des militants anarchistes
 Biography at El Éphéméride anarchiste
 Biography at Estrella Negra (in Catalan)

1919 births
2010 deaths
20th-century Spanish women
Anarcha-feminists
Anarchist writers
Anarcho-syndicalists
Confederación Nacional del Trabajo members
French Resistance members
Mujeres Libres
People from Barcelona
Spanish socialist feminists
Spanish feminists
Spanish feminist writers
Spanish non-fiction writers
Spanish women of the Spanish Civil War (Republican faction)
Spanish women poets
Spanish women writers
Spanish emigrants to France
Spanish anarchists